Arctia buddenbrocki is a moth in the family Erebidae. It was described by Hans Kotzsch in 1929. It is found in Gansu and southern Shaanxi, both in China.

The species of the genus Preparctia, including this one, were moved to Arctia as a result of phylogenetic research published by Rönkä et al. in 2016.

References

Moths described in 1929
Arctiini